MP United FC may refer to:

 MP United FC (India) - an association football club from Madhya Pradesh, India
 MP United FC (Northern Mariana Islands) - an association football club from the Northern Mariana Islands